Jean d'Eaubonne (March 8, 1903 – July 30, 1971) was a French art director. He received an Oscar nomination in 1951 for his work on Max Ophüls's La Ronde''.

Selected filmography

 The Polish Jew (1931)
 Love and Luck (1932)
 Miss Helyett (1933)
 The Queen of Biarritz (1934)
 Little Jacques (1934)
 The Green Jacket (1937)
 The Girl in the Taxi (1937)
 The Men Without Names (1937)
 Crossroads (1938)
 Three Waltzes (1938)
 People Who Travel (1938)
 The Train for Venice (1938)
 Star Without Light (1946)
 Devil and the Angel (1946)
 Dilemma of Two Angels (1948)
 I Like Only You (1949)
 Lady Paname (1950)
 La Ronde (1950)
 This Man Is Dangerous (1953)
 Marianne of My Youth (1955)
 The Affair of the Poisons (1955)
 The Lovers of Lisbon (1955)
 The Bride Is Much Too Beautiful (1956)
 Paris, Palace Hotel (1956)
 A Kiss for a Killer (1957)
 Nina (1959)
 The Nina B. Affair (1961)
 Charade (1963)
 Encounter in Salzburg (1964)
 Johnny Banco (1967)
 Leontine (1968)
 A Golden Widow (1969)
 The Road to Salina'' (1970)

References

External links

French art directors
1903 births
1971 deaths
People from Talence